A Curry house may refer to a restaurant serving South Asian cuisine, particularly in the UK, Australia, and Europe.

Curry House may also refer to:

In the United States (by state then city)

Curry House, a defunct chain of fast-food restaurants in California formerly owned by House Foods of Japan
J. L. M. Curry House, Talladega, Alabama, listed on the National Register of Historic Places (NRHP), in Talladega County, Alabama
Curry-Chucovich House, Denver, Colorado, listed on the NRHP in Downtown Denver, Colorado
Stockton-Curry House, Quincy, Florida, NRHP-listed, in Gadsden County, Florida
Curry Hill Plantation, Bainbridge, Georgia, listed on the NRHP in Decatur County, Georgia
Daniel Curry House, Harrodsburg, Kentucky, listed on the NRHP in Mercer County, Kentucky
Solomon S. Curry House, Ironwood, Michigan, listed on the NRHP in Gogebic County, Michigan
Abraham Curry House, Carson City, Nevada, listed on the NRHP in Carson City, Nevada
Nathaniel Curry House, Roseburg, Oregon, listed on the NRHP in Douglas County, Oregon
Lewis Curry House, Vernal, Utah, listed on the NRHP in Uintah County, Utah